Explosion is a 1973 Romanian drama film directed by Mircea Drăgan. It was entered into the 8th Moscow International Film Festival where it won a Diploma.

Plot
The film is about a real event that took place in 1970, the fire of the ship Vrachos (renamed in the film as Poseidon) on which 3,700 of 4-000 tons of ammonium nitrate were loaded and which threatened to destroy the city Galați.

Cast
 Radu Beligan as Luca
 Gheorghe Dinica as Salamander
 Toma Caragiu as Corbea
 Dem Radulescu as Neagu
 Jean Constantin as Tilica
 George Motoi as Marinescu
 Toma Dimitriu
 Colea Rautu as Anghel
 Draga Olteanu Matei as Angela (as Draga Olteanu-Matei)

References

External links
 

1973 films
1973 drama films
1970s Romanian-language films
Films directed by Mircea Drăgan
Romanian drama films